Duszniki-Zdrój, often simplified to Duszniki, is a spa town in Kłodzko Valley and Kłodzko County, Lower Silesian Voivodeship, in southwestern Poland. As of December 2021, the town has a population of 4,329. Situated on the Bystrzyca River, it attracts tourists from Poland and around the world.

History

The settlement was mentioned in 1324. It was granted town rights in 1346. Until 1595 it remained in private hands. A trade route connecting Silesia and Bohemia ran through the town, contributing to its development. Weaving and paper production developed, as well as the iron industry, but the local iron deposits quickly depleted. In 1584 a town hall was built, and in 1605 a paper mill, now housing the Museum of Papermaking. The town's development was stopped by the Thirty Years' War (1618-1648). In 1669 Polish King John II Casimir Vasa stopped in the town after his abdication.

In 1748 the first research of mineral springs was carried out, and in 1751 spa treatments began. In 1769, the town obtained the status of a spa town. In 1822 a pump room was founded. In 1826, 16-year-old Frédéric Chopin visited the spa. He was cured there and gave his first concert outside of the Russian Partition of Poland, which was also his first charity concert. In 1877 a palm house was built with a concert hall and a reading room, and after 1881 many guesthouses were built. In 1896 or 1897, a monument was unveiled commemorating the 60th anniversary of Chopin's stay.

In 1949, 1,500 Greek refugees of the Greek Civil War, mostly women and children, were temporarily admitted in Duszniki-Zdrój before new homes were found for them in other towns.

The town suffered in the 1997 Central European flood.

Economy
The town's economy is based on tourism, with several hundred thousand people visiting the town and the area every year. In addition, there are several mineral water bottling plants, a traditional paper works and a crystal jewellery producer. The Museum of Papermaking in Duszniki-Zdrój is located in the town.

Spa
Although the area was known for its healthy waters at least since the late Middle Ages, the spa was officially founded in 1769. The natural sparkling waters of Duszniki are used in treatment of a variety of illnesses, including cardiac problems, gastrical problems. In addition, there is a number of facilities for balneotherapy located in Duszniki and an osteoporosis treatment centre.

Sights
Duszniki-Zdrój most recognizable landmark is the Museum of Papermaking established in an old 17th century paper mill. It is listed as an official Historic Monument of Poland. Other significant places include the Saints Peter and Paul church, which contains a unique baroque, whale-stylized pulpit, and the Fryderyk Chopin Theatre, established in the place where in 1826, 16-year-old Fryderyk Chopin played his first concert outside of the Russian Partition of Poland and his first charity concert. The annual International Chopin Festival is held here since 1946.

International relations

Duszniki-Zdrój is twinned with:

 Audun-le-Tiche, France
 Bad Sulza, Germany
 Deštné v Orlických horách, Czech Republic
 Hoya, Germany
 Nové Město nad Metují, Czech Republic
 Olešnice v Orlických horách, Czech Republic
 Orlické Záhoří, Czech Republic
 Sedloňov, Czech Republic
 Trzcianka, Poland

Gallery

References

External links

 Duszniki-Zdrój On-line
 Bad-Reinerz on old postcards
 Official site
 Jewish Community in Duszniki-Zdrój on Virtual Shtetl
 Tourists attractions

Cities and towns in Lower Silesian Voivodeship
Cities in Silesia
Duszniki Zdroj
Spa towns in Poland